The Progressive Nationalist Party (PNP) was a short-lived Australian far-right political party. It was formed in 1981 as a merger between the Australian National Alliance, Immigration Control Association and the Progressive Conservative Party. In 1982 it was folded and the National Action was formed in its place. PNP was Strasserist in its ideology. It claimed a membership of 1,000.

See also
 Far-right politics in Australia

References

Defunct political parties in Australia
Far-right political parties in Australia
Strasserism
Political parties established in 1981
Political parties disestablished in 1982
1981 establishments in Australia
1982 disestablishments in Australia